Benburb) is a village and townland in County Tyrone, Northern Ireland. It lies 7.5 miles from Armagh and 8 miles from Dungannon. The River Blackwater runs alongside the village as does the Ulster Canal.

History 

It is best known, in historical terms, for the Battle of Benburb that took place there in 1646. This was fought between the armies of Confederate Ireland led by Owen Roe O'Neill and the Scottish Covenanters led by Munro. The battle resulted in a crushing victory for O'Neill's men at the townland of Drumflugh around a mile outside the village. It was commemorated in the ballad "The Battle of Benburb".

Since the Battle of Benburb was a rare 17th-century Irish military victory, in 1890 new Irish nationalist dominated Corporation in Dublin city renamed Barrack Street in Dublin's north inner city after the battle. Benburb Street runs between Queen Street and Blackhall Place. There is also a Benburb Street in south Belfast just off the Donegall Road.

In later years Benburb became known for its linen production, as did many areas in Northern Ireland and later still for agriculture, most notably apple farming, and mushroom production.

Benburb was the home of the 17th century poet Maurice O'Dugan (fl.1660), who was reputed to have written the poems Gluas do chabhlach, Bhi Eoghan air buile,  Faraoir chaill Eire a céile fircheart and the famous air The Coolin.

Places of interest 
The village is also home to the impressive Benburb Castle built in 1611 by Sir Richard Wingfield on the ruins of a military fortification constructed by Prince Shane O'Neill, circa 1558, at the base of a limestone cliff overlooking the River Blackwater, the border between County Tyrone and County Armagh. The castle is in excellent condition having been recently restored and stands in the grounds of the imposing Servite Priory, a religious order based in the village.

Benburb Priory
Wingfield was made Viscount Powerscourt in 1618 and the estate remained in the Wingfield family until sold in 1877 to Belfast distiller James Bruce, who died in 1917. It then went to his brother who sold it. The manor house passed through a number of owners before being requisitioned by the War Office as military hospital during World War II. From 1943 – 1944 the members of the British Army Medical Corp were stationed there, and from October 1943 to April 1944 it was the home to personnel of the American 7th Field Hospital. The hospital had 135 beds. The Servite Order acquired the property in 1947, initially for a seminary. In more recent years the Priory has been a cross-community centre supporting over 30 groups spanning culture and heritage, older people, St Peregrine cancer support, education and rehabilitation.

The Priory is also home to Benburb Priory Library and Museum which holds extensive collections of Servite and Marian books and artefacts, the Servite archives for Britain and Ireland, the Priory (formerly Wingfield/Powerscourt) estate and local history. The Library and Museum was established in 2016 (Professor Gerry McKenna MRIA; founding chair) and includes the extensive and valuable private collection of Hugo Ricciardi O'Neill, Chief of the Clans of O'Neill, who resides in Setubal, Portugal.

Education
Benburb Primary School 
Benburb Community Playgroup

Demography

19th century population
The population of the village decreased during the 19th century:

21st century population
Benburb in the Northern Ireland UK Census in 2011 was classified as a Hamlet, with a population of 598 people.
8.9% were 18 or younger
11.7% were aged 60 and over 
40.0% were male
60.0% were female 
55.6% were from a Catholic background
25.4% were from a Protestant background
19.0% stated another Religion or had no religion

Townland
The townland is situated in the historic barony of Dungannon Middle and the civil parish of Clonfeacle and covers an area of 185 acres.

The population of the townland declined during the 19th century:

The increase seen in the 1881 Census was ascribed mainly to the building of houses for millworkers.

See also

 Abbeys and priories in Northern Ireland (County Tyrone)
 List of villages in Northern Ireland
 List of townlands of County Tyrone
 Ulster Canal

References

External links 

Villages in County Tyrone
Townlands of County Tyrone
Civil parish of Clonfeacle